Edmondo F. Lupieri (born 10 November 1950 in Turin) is an Italian New Testament scholar. He currently is living in the United States and serves as the John Cardinal Cody Endowed Chair at Loyola University Chicago.

Works 
Works by Edmondo Lupieri:

Books 
 Cronache dal Trumpistan. Diario di un teologo italiano in America [Chronicles From Trumpistan: A Diary of an Italian Theologian in America]  pref. by Brunetto Salvarani (di santa ragione, 9), Di Girolamo, Trapani, 2020. 
 I mille volti della Maddalena. Saggi e studi  (edited), Carocci Ed., Roma, 2020.
 Mary Magdalene from the New Testament to the New Age and Beyond (edited and co-authored) Brill, Leiden, 2019. 
 Chi ha rubato i cieli? Galileo, la Lettera a Cristina e le origini della modernità (co-edited with Paolo Ponzio), Edizioni di Pagina, Bari, 2019.
 Golden Calf Traditions in Early Judaism, Christianity, and Islam (co-edited with Eric F. Mason and co-authored) (TBN, 23), Brill, Leiden/Boston, 2018. 
 Where Have All the Heavens Gone? Galileo’s Letter to the Grand Duchess Christina (co-edited with John P. McCarthy), Cascade Books, Eugene (OR), 2017.
 Una sposa per Gesù. Maria Maddalena tra antichità e postmoderno (edited and co-authored) (Frecce, 241), Carocci Ed., Rome, 2017 (repr. 2018, 2019).
 In nome di Dio. Storie di una conquista (Biblioteca di cultura religiosa 72), Paideia, Brescia, 2014.
translated into English as In the Name of God:  the making of global Christianity  Transl. by Giovanna Lammers, Revised by the Author, with J. Hooten and A. Kunder, Wm. B. Eerdmans Publ. Co., Grand Rapids (MI) / Cambridge (UK), 2011.
 Giovanni e Gesù. Storia di un antagonismo (Frecce 161), Carocci, Rome, 2013.  
 A Commentary to the Apocalypse of John, Transl. by Maria Poggi Johnson and Adam Kamesar, Wm. B. Eerdmans Publ. Co., Grand Rapids (MI) / Cambridge (UK), 2006. 
 Identità e conquista. Esiti e conflitti di un'evangelizzazione, Edizioni Dehoniane, Bologna, 2005.
 The Mandaeans: The Last Gnostics (ITSORS), W. B. Eerdmans Publ. Co., Grand Rapids (MI) / Cambridge (UK) 2002. 
 L'Apocalisse di Giovanni (Scrittori Greci e Latini), Fondazione Lorenzo Valla - A. Mondadori Editore, Milano 1999, 5th reprint 2009. English edition, Wm. B. Eerdmans Publ. Co., Grand Rapids, MI (2006).
 "Fra Gerusalemme e Roma," in G. Filoramo - D. Menozzi, Storia del Cristianesimo, vol. I: L'Antichità, Roma-Bari 1997, pp. 3-137. 6th reprint 2009.
 Gesù Cristo e gli altri dei. Diffusione e modificazione del cristianesimo nei paesi extraeuropei (Oscar Saggi, 394), Milano, Mondadori, 1994.
 I Mandei. Gli ultimi gnostici (Biblioteca di Cultura Religiosa, 61), Brescia, Paideia 1993, pp. 352. Reprint 2010. English edition: The Mandaeans: The Last Gnostics (Wm. B. Eerdmans Publ. Co., Grand Rapids, MI), 2002.
 Giovanni e Gesù. Storia di un antagonismo (Uomini e Religioni, 60), Milano, Mondadori 1991.
 Giovanni Battista nelle tradizioni sinottiche (Studi Biblici, 82), Brescia, Paideia 1988.
 Il cielo è il mio trono. Isaia 40,12 e 66,1 nella tradizione testimoniaria (Temi e Testi, 28), Roma, Ed. di Storia e Letteratura 1980.

Non-Academic Books 
Il peccato dei padri (2009)
Il patto. Un thriller teologico (2005)
Nel segno del sangue (2003)

References 

Writers from Turin
Living people
Italian Christian theologians
20th-century Italian male writers
Loyola University Chicago faculty
21st-century Italian writers
New Testament scholars
Scholars of Mandaeism
Italian expatriates in the United States
1950 births